The International Fellowship of Christian Assemblies (IFCA), formerly known as the Christian Church of North America (CCNA), is a North American Pentecostal denomination with roots in the Italian-American community. Central offices are located in Transfer, Pennsylvania. Ministries of the church include Benevolence, Home Missions, FOCUS, Foreign Missions, Education, Lay Ministries, and Public Relations. A convention is held annually, and their official publication is Vista, a quarterly magazine.

Membership in 2000 was about 7200 in 96 churches in the United States. They also have other affiliated congregations the United States and internationally in Africa, Australia, Canada, Europe, India, Brazil and South America. Rev. Mike Player is the General Overseer of the denomination.

History
The International Fellowship of Christian Assemblies is part of the larger Pentecostal movement that began in the United States during the first part of the 20th century and is rooted in a revival movement among the ethnic Italians in Chicago. Rev. Louis Francescon organized the first Italian-American Pentecostal church there in 1907. The Rev. Francesco Emma (1875–1948) started the first church in New York City for Italian immigrants. News outlets at the time reported that his funeral lasted five days as seven thousand people visited from various parts of the world. The Rev. Joseph Giordano (1890-1955), continued with an Italian and later English ministry in Jersey City, New Jersey from 1927 through the 1950s. Following his passing, the Rev Biagio Parisi (1914-1992) continued the Jersey City ministry. The Rev. Joseph De Mola (1912–1987), who had come out of the Rev Joseph Giordano’s ministry,  continued with an Italian and English ministry in Staten Island during the 1950s and 1960s. The first convention of the Italian Pentecostal Movement was called in Niagara Falls, New York in 1927, where the group adopted articles of faith and organized into a cooperative fellowship known as the Unorganized Italian Christian Churches of the United States. This helped build the movement into a cohesive whole. Later, the fellowship slightly modified its name to the Italian Christian Churches of North America.  By the 1940s, "Italian" was dropped, in order to convey the message that its message was not just restricted to Italians.  In 1948, the movement was incorporated in Pennsylvania as The Missionary Society of the Christian Church of North America. In 1963, the body was restructured as the General Council of the Christian Church of North America.  In 2006, it adopted its current name.

Doctrinal beliefs
The beliefs of the IFCA are set forth in their 12-article "Statement of Faith". They are Trinitarian in theology, fundamental in Bibliology, premillennial in eschatology, and Pentecostal in emphasis. Like most Pentecostal denominations, the organization holds that speaking in tongues is the initial evidence of the baptism with the Holy Spirit, and that divine healing is an expected result of prayer. The church holds two ordinances - water baptism by immersion and the Lord's supper. Somewhat unusual is their 8th statement, which is belief "in the Apostolic regulations regarding foods and practices that injure the body and offend the holiness of God," citing the Council of Jerusalem in Acts 15.

See also
Assemblies of God in Italy - IFCA branch in Italy.
Canadian Assemblies of God - IFCA branch in Canada.
Christian Congregation in Brazil - Sister movement in Brazil.
Fellowship of Christian Assemblies unrelated Pentecostal body.

References

External links
IFCA official website

Pentecostal denominations
Finished Work Pentecostals
Fundamentalist denominations
Italian-American culture